James Miller (September 21, 1836 – March 4, 1914) was a United States Navy sailor and a recipient of America's highest military decoration—the Medal of Honor—for his actions in the American Civil War.

Biography
Of Norwegian descent, Miller was born in Denmark on September 21, 1836, and enlisted in the U.S. Navy from Massachusetts. He served aboard the steam gunboat . During the Battle of Legareville on John's Island (near Legareville, South Carolina) by the Stono River on December 25, 1863, he continued to take soundings while under fire. For his conduct on this occasion, Quartermaster James Miller received the Medal of Honor and promoted to Acting Master's Mate.

Miller died on March 4, 1914, at age 77 and was buried in Philadelphia. The destroyer , which served in World War II and the Korean War, was named in his honor.

Medal of Honor citation
Quartermaster Miller's official Medal of Honor citation reads:

Served as quartermaster on board the U.S. Steam Gunboat Marblehead off Legareville, Stono River, December 25, 1863, during an engagement with the enemy on John's Island. Acting courageously under the fierce hostile fire, Miller behaved gallantly throughout the engagement which resulted in the enemy's withdrawal and abandonment of its arms.

See also

List of American Civil War Medal of Honor recipients: M–P

Notes

References

 

1836 births
1914 deaths
United States Navy Medal of Honor recipients
Union Navy sailors
People of Massachusetts in the American Civil War
Quartermasters
Foreign-born Medal of Honor recipients
Danish emigrants to the United States
American people of Norwegian descent
American Civil War recipients of the Medal of Honor